Lungalunga (Lunga Lunga), frequently though ambiguously called Minigir, is spoken by a small number of the Tolai people of Papua New Guinea, who live on the Gazelle Peninsula in East New Britain Province.

Classification
Lungalunga belongs to the Oceanic branch of the Austronesian language family. The most immediate subgroup is the Patpatar–Tolai group of languages which also includes Kuanua (also spoken on the Gazelle Peninsula) and Patpatar (spoken on New Ireland).

A "Tolai-Nakanai trade language" reported in the literature was apparently not a pidgin as assumed, but Minigir (Lungalunga) with perhaps some Meramera or Nakanai mixed in.

Geographic distribution
Lungalunga is spoken on Ataliklikun Bay, in the villages of Lungalunga, Kabaira and Vunamarita, located on the Gazelle Peninsula in the East New Britain Province of Papua New Guinea.

Grammar

Independent pronouns

Lungalunga pronouns have four number distinctions (singular, dual, trial and plural) and three person distinctions (first, second and third) as well as an inclusive and exclusive distinction. There are no gender distinctions.

Syntax
The usual word order of Lungalunga is subject–verb–object (SVO).

References

 
 

St George linkage
Languages of East New Britain Province